Veerapandiya Kattabomman was an 18th-century Palayakarrar ('Polygar') chieftain.

Kattabomman may also refer to:
INS Kattabomman, an Indian Navy transmission facility
Kattabomman (film), a 1993 Tamil film

See also
Veerapandiya Kattabomman (film), a 1959 Tamil film